René Séjourné (20 May 1930 – 1 June 2018) was a French Roman Catholic bishop.

Séjourné was born in France and was ordained to the priesthood in 1995. He served as titular bishop of Labico from 1987 to 1990. Séjourné then served as the bishop of the Roman Catholic Diocese of Saint-Flour, France, from 1990 to 2006.

Notes

1930 births
2018 deaths
Bishops of Saint-Flour